The creamy-bellied antwren (Herpsilochmus motacilloides) is a species of bird in the family Thamnophilidae. It is endemic to Peru.

Its natural habitat is subtropical or tropical moist montane forests.

References

creamy-bellied antwren
Birds of the Peruvian Andes
Endemic birds of Peru
creamy-bellied antwren
creamy-bellied antwren
Taxonomy articles created by Polbot